Trevor Barker Beach Oval, currently known under naming rights as the Wilson Storage Trevor Barker Beach Oval, is an Australian rules football ground in Beach Road, on the border between Hampton and Sandringham, Victoria. Most commonly known as Beach Road Oval throughout its existence, in 1998 the ground was renamed after the late Trevor Barker, who died of cancer in 1996 at the age of 39. Barker had coached the Sandringham Football Club to the 1992 and 1994 premierships.

In the late 1920s, the Sandringham council had been seeking to establish a senior football club in the district to join the Victorian Football Association, and providing a fenced venue to which admission could be charged was a requirement of the Association. After a previous unsuccessful application, the council received permission from the State Government to fence the existing playing oval in February 1929; the Sandringham Football Club entered the VFA the same season.

The oval has a single grandstand (the Neil Bencraft Grandstand), a southern end named after record breaking goal kicker Nick Sautner (the Sautner Goal), and an administration centre (the John Mennie Administration Centre) – a social club and a capacity for 10,000. A record crowd of 18,000 attended the venue's first Sunday VFA premiership game, held between Sandringham and Port Melbourne Football Club in April 1964. A rec footy competition was also played at the ground.

References

External links

Victorian Football League grounds
Sports venues in Melbourne
Buildings and structures in the City of Bayside
Sport in the City of Bayside